The 12837 / 12838 Howrah–Puri Express is a Superfast Express train belonging to Indian Railways – South Eastern Railway zone that runs between  and  in India.

It operates as train number 12837 from Howrah Junction to Puri and as train number 12838 in the reverse direction, serving the states of West Bengal and Odisha.

Coaches

The 12837 / 38 Howrah–Puri Express has 1 AC First, 2 AC 2 tier, 5 AC 3 tier, 2 AC 3 tier economy, 8 Sleeper class, 2 General Unreserved, 1 EOG coach & 1 SLR coach. It does not carry a pantry car .

As is customary with most train services in India, coach composition may be amended at the discretion of Indian Railways depending on demand. The train got LHB rake on 30 April 2019.

Service

As the average speed of the train is above , as per Indian Railways rules, its fare includes a Superfast surcharge.

Route

Loco traction

As the route is fully electrified, a Santragachi based  WAP-7 powers the train for its entire journey.

Operation

12837 Howrah–Puri Express runs from Howrah Junction on a daily basis reaching Puri the next day .

12838 Puri–Howrah Express runs from Puri on a daily basis reaching Howrah Junction the next day.

References 

 http://www.holidayiq.com/railways/howrah-puri-express-12837-train.html
 https://indiarailinfo.com/train/-train-howrah-puri-sf-express-12837/1290/1/217
 https://www.youtube.com/watch?v=6P_IXLmkFe8
 https://www.youtube.com/watch?v=ZCxQZ4rHQy4
 https://www.flickr.com/photos/abhinavnfr/7312350078/

External links

Rail transport in Howrah
Transport in Puri
Express trains in India
Rail transport in West Bengal
Rail transport in Odisha